The Haughton River is a river located in North Queensland, Australia.

Course and features
The headwaters of the river rise in the Haughton Valley of the Leichhardt Range near Mingela and flow in a north easterly direction almost immediately crossing the Flinders Highway. The river then passes between Mount Prince Charles and Mount Norman then past Glendale. Major Creek discharges into the Haughton under Major Creek Mountain and the river continues crossing the Bruce Highway just south of Giru. The Haughton enters Bowling Green Bay National Park and finally discharges into Bowling Green Bay south of Townsville near Cungulla and then into the Coral Sea.

Of this latter area,  is composed of estuarine wetlands.

The floodplain area of the catchment also holds valuable wetlands, parts of the Bowling Green Bay National Park and Ramsar site (QDEH 1991) are listed in the Directory of Important Wetlands. The upper part of the catchment has few permanent waterholes. An estimated 77% of the catchment is cleared, cattle grazing is the dominant land use in the area, with the production of sugarcane and other forms of horticulture taking up most of the catchment area.

A total of 27 species of fish have been found in the river, including the glassfish, Pacific Short-finned Eel, blue catfish, milkfish, Fly-specked hardyhead, mouth almighty, Empire gudgeon, barred grunter, barramundi, oxeye herring, mangrove jack, eastern rainbowfish, Bony bream, Freshwater Longtom and Seven-spot Archerfish.

Etymology
The river was named in 1861 after Richard Houghton, a stockman, by his friend the pastoralist and explorer James Cassady. Originally named Houghton River it was renamed to the current spelling by the Surveyor General in 1950 at the request of local residents and the electoral office.

See also

References

Rivers of Queensland
North Queensland
Bodies of water of the Coral Sea